The 1974–75 ABA season was the eighth season of the American Basketball Association. The Kentucky Colonels won the 1975 ABA Championship after winning the Eastern Division; the Denver Nuggets won the Western Division.  Julius Erving and George McGinnis shared the league's MVP award.

Preseason

Prior to the start of the season the Eastern Division changed as the Memphis Tams gave way to the Memphis Sounds and the Carolina Cougars were bought by Ozzie and Daniel Silna and relocated and became the Spirits of St. Louis.  The Western Division remained unchanged save for the Denver Rockets renaming themselves the Denver Nuggets.

The ABA and NBA continued playing preseason exhibition games between their teams.  The ABA won 16 of the 23 games, to 7 wins for the NBA.  Among those games was the Pacers' first game in Market Square Arena in which they defeated the Milwaukee Bucks 118-115 before a standing room only crowd of 17,287; Bob Dandridge had 46 points and Kareem Abdul-Jabbar 26 for the Bucks.

Regular season

On February 14, 1975, Julius Erving of the New York Nets scored a team-record 63 points against the San Diego Conquistadors in a four overtime game.

The 8th ABA All-Star Game was played on January 28, 1975, in San Antonio, Texas.  10,449 attended.  The East was coached by Kevin Loughery of the New York Nets and the West was coached by Larry Brown of the Denver Nuggets.  The East won 151-124; Freddie Lewis of the Spirits of St. Louis was the game's MVP after scoring 26 points.

The Denver Nuggets posted the ABA's best record of the season, winning the Western Division with a record of 65-19 (.774).  That record was second best in ABA history, behind only the 1971-72 Kentucky Colonels' mark of 68-16 (.810).  The 1974-75 Nuggets also finished second in ABA history behind the 1971-72 Colonels for team scoring difference, outscoring their opponents by an average of 8.40 points per game to the 1971-72 Colonels' 8.98 points.

In the Eastern Division the Kentucky Colonels won 22 of their last 25 regular season games to tie the New York Nets for first place in the Eastern Division at 58-26 (.690).

Final standings

Eastern Division

Western Division

Asterisk (*) denotes playoff team

Bold - ABA Champions

Playoffs

The 1975 ABA Playoffs began with a one-game series between the Kentucky Colonels and New York Nets for first place in the Eastern Division.  The game was played on April 4, 1975, at Freedom Hall in Louisville, Kentucky.  The Colonels won, 108 to 99.

The Colonels then defeated the Memphis Sounds 4 games to 1 in the Eastern Division semifinals, while the Nets lost to the Spirits of St. Louis in the other Eastern Division semifinal, 4 games to 1.  The Colonels then defeated the Spirits in the Eastern Division finals 4 games to 1.

In the Western Division the first place Denver Nuggets won their semifinal round against the Utah Stars, 4 games to 2, and the third seeded Indiana Pacers upset the #2 seed San Antonio Spurs 4 games to 2 in the other Western Division semifinal.  The Pacers pulled another upset in the Western Division finals, upending the Nuggets 4 games to 3.

In the 1975 ABA Finals the Colonels defeated the Pacers 4 games to 1 to claim the league championship.

Awards and honors

The league's MVP award for the 1974-75 season was awarded jointly to Julius Erving of the New York Nets and George McGinnis of the Indiana Pacers.

McGinnis was also the league's leading scorer at 29.78 points per game (2,353 points in 79 games).  Erving was second at 27.89 points per game.

Swen Nater of the San Antonio Spurs led the league in rebounding, averaging 16.40 per game.  Artis Gilmore of the Kentucky Colonels was second with 16.20 per game, down from 18.31 the season before.

Mack Calvin of the Denver Nuggets set an all time ABA record for free throw percentage, hitting 475 of 530 attempts for an 89.622% average.

Artis Gilmore was named Most Valuable Player of the 1975 ABA Playoffs. Gilmore scored 28 points and grabbed 31 rebounds in the final game of the Finals and in Game 3 in Indianapolis Gilmore scored 41 points and nabbed 28 rebounds.

 ABA Most Valuable Player Award: Julius Erving, New York Nets & George McGinnis, Indiana Pacers
 Rookie of the Year: Marvin Barnes, Spirits of St. Louis
 Coach of the Year: Larry Brown, Denver Nuggets
 Playoffs MVP: Artis Gilmore, Kentucky Colonels
 All-Star Game MVP: Freddie Lewis, Spirits of St. Louis
 Executive of the Year: Carl Scheer, Denver Nuggets
All-ABA First Team 
 Julius Erving, New York Nets (3rd First Team selection, 4th overall selection)
 George McGinnis, Indiana Pacers (2nd First Team selection, 3rd overall selection)
 Artis Gilmore, Kentucky Colonels (4th selection)
 Mack Calvin, Carolina Cougars (3rd First Team selection, 4th overall selection)
 Ron Boone, Utah Stars (1st First Team selection, 2nd overall selection)
All-ABA Second Team
 Marvin Barnes, Spirits of St. Louis
 George Gervin, San Antonio Spurs
 Swen Nater, San Antonio Spurs (2nd selection)
 Brian Taylor, New York Nets
 James Silas, San Antonio Spurs
All-Defensive Team
Don Buse, Indiana Pacers
Artis Gilmore (3rd selection), Kentucky Colonels
Bobby Jones, Denver Nuggets
Wil Jones, Kentucky Colonels
Brian Taylor, New York Nets
All-Rookie Team
Marvin Barnes, Spirits of St. Louis
Gus Gerard, Spirits of St. Louis
Bobby Jones, Denver Nuggets
Billy Knight, Indiana Pacers
Moses Malone, Utah Stars

References

External links
RememberTheABA.com

 
ABA